Dreieich-Buchschlag station is a railway station on the Rhine-Main S-Bahn in the town of Dreieich in the German state of Hesse. It was opened in 1879 on the Main-Neckar Railway. The station is classified by Deutsche Bahn as a category 4 station.

History
The station was opened in 1879 with the name of Buchschlag-Sprendlingen on the Main-Neckar Railway line. It opened up a forest district in the municipality of Mitteldick. In order to stimulate the development of the surrounding communities, it was decided on 1 April 1905 to build the Dreieich Railway (Dreieichbahn) between Buchschlag-Sprendlingen and Ober-Roden. Buchschlag-Sprendlingen station was renamed Dreieich-Buchschlag on 1 January 1977.

Location 
The station is located on the western edge of Buchschlag on Buchschlager Allee (continuing to the west as Wald am Mitteldicker Weg) on the Main-Neckar Railway, connecting Frankfurt and Heidelberg. Shortly south of the station, the Dreieich Railway branches off to Rödermark-Ober Roden.

Connections 
Today, the station is in the territory of the Rhein-Main-Verkehrsverbund (Rhine-Main Transport Association, RMV), with S-Bahn services operated by the Rhine-Main S-Bahn and regional services operated by Deutsche Bahn. In addition, it has two bus stops, a taxi stand and park and ride facility.

Infrastructure 
The entrance building of Dreieich-Buchschlag station has been sold off and now houses a restaurant. There is still a sign reading Buchschlag-Sprendlingen on the station building.

Immediately next to the entrance building, there are 5 tracks passing over a level crossing over Buchschlager Allee. Since many trains pass over the crossing, the barriers can remain closed for a long time.

Public transport services

Rail
The station is served by the Rhine-Main S-Bahn and DB Regio services.

S-Bahn lines S3 and S4 each stop at the station every half-hour from Monday to Saturday, which together provide services every 15 minutes. On Sundays, the S4 does not run, resulting in a service every 30 minutes by the S3. The Regionalbahn RB 61 service (Dreieich Railway) runs from Dieburg to Frankfurt every 60 minutes. On weekdays there are additional services between Rödermark Ober-Roden and Neu-Isenburg resulting in a service every 30 minutes on the common section.

Bus 
Some bus routes stop at the station, mainly city bus line OF-64. During the summer months (May 1 to September/October) each year, Waldseebus (OF-Line 65) runs to and from Langener Waldsee, a popular Baggersee (lake established in an abandoned quarry) used as part of the Ironman Germany triathlon competition.

Notes

External links
 

Rhine-Main S-Bahn stations
Railway stations in Hesse
Buildings and structures in Offenbach (district)
Railway stations in Germany opened in 1879